The Cleveland Free Times was an alternative weekly newspaper in Cleveland, Ohio. Its first issue was published on September 30, 1992.

The Free Times and Cleveland Scene, a competing weekly paper, were purchased by Times-Shamrock Communications, located in Scranton, Pennsylvania, in June 2008. Times-Shamrock is a media company that publishes daily and weekly newspapers throughout Pennsylvania, Virginia, Maryland, Florida, Michigan, and Texas. They also own radio stations in Baltimore. The Free Times published its final issue on July 16, 2008. It merged with Cleveland Scene.

Noteworthy staff members included Roldo Bartimole.

References

External links
 

Defunct newspapers published in Cleveland
Alternative weekly newspapers published in the United States
Publications disestablished in 2008
Publications established in 1992
1992 establishments in Ohio
2008 disestablishments in Ohio